Moira railway station was a railway station at Moira, Leicestershire on the Leicester to Burton upon Trent Line.

History
The line was built for the Midland Railway and opened in 1849. Moira station was closed in 1964 but the line remains open for freight traffic.

The former station building can be seen at the end of Station Drive, Moira, just off the main Ashby Road. The former station is also reflected in the name of the village pub, the Railway Inn.

In the 1990s BR planned to restore passenger services to the line as the second phase of its Ivanhoe Line project. However, after the privatisation of British Rail in 1995 this phase of the project was discontinued. In 2009 the Association of Train Operating Companies published a £49 million proposal to restore passenger services to the line that would include reopening a station at Moira.

Stationmasters

John Willoughby ca. 1856
William Pykett until 1864 (afterwards station master at Whatstandwell)
S. Hodgkinson from 1864
George Drakeford until 1874
W. Seaton 1874 - 1876 (formerly station master at Wichnor Junction)
J. Sandford 1876 - 1880
James Thompson 1880 - 1883 
G.J. Bursnell 1883 - 1887
Harry Ellis 1887 - 1892
A.H. Baldwin 1892 - 1896
G. Abbutt 1896 - 1898
John Witts 1898 - 1908
Thomas William Peach 1908 - 1939
F. Tunnicliffe 1939 - 1947
Reginald W. Whitehead B.E.M. 1947 - 1953 (formerly station master at Old Dalby and Grimston)
A.F. Manison from 1953 
Mr. Brazier ca. 1965

References

Former Midland Railway stations
Disused railway stations in Leicestershire
Proposed railway stations in England
Railway stations in Great Britain opened in 1849
Railway stations in Great Britain closed in 1964
Beeching closures in England